Ungerleider is a surname. Notable people with the surname include: 

Howard Ungerleider (born 1968), American businessman
Leslie Ungerleider (1946–2020), American experimental psychologist and neuroscientist
Mór Ungerleider (1872–1955), Hungarian cafe owner and showman
Shoshana R. Ungerleider, American doctor, journalist and film producer
Steven Ungerleider (1949–2023), American sports psychologist, author, and documentary film producer
Suzie Ungerleider, American-Canadian  singer-songwriter